Brandon Plantation may refer to:
Lower Brandon Plantation (Prince George County, Virginia), historically known as Brandon Plantation
Upper Brandon Plantation (Prince George County, Virginia), created from Lower Brandon
Brandon Plantation (Halifax County, Virginia)